Alternate uses: see Renaissance (disambiguation).

Renaissance is a 2002 live album by Mickey Finn's T. Rex. The band plays songs made popular by the original T. Rex during the late 1960s and 1970s.

Track listing
 "Ride a White Swan"
 "I Love to Boogie"
 "Telegram Sam"
 "Metal Guru"
 "New York City"
 "Solid Gold Easy Action"
 "Teenage Dream"
 "Life's a Gas"
 "Spaceball Ricochet"
 "Cosmic Dancer"
 "Children of the Revolution"
 "The Groover"
 "Born to Boogie"
 "Jeepster"
 "Hot Love"
 "20th Century Boy"
 "Get it On"

Personnel
 Rob Benson - lead vocals
 Mickey Finn - bongo drums
 Alan Silson - guitar
 Dave Major - keyboards
 Tony Allday - bass
 Paul Fenton - drums

2002 live albums